John Moulton Day (3 April 1924 – 17 February 2003) was an American historian.

Biography 
Born in Evanston (Illinois) in 1924, John Day taught at the Paris VII - Denis-Diderot University of Paris, in Israel, in the United States and at the University of Cagliari. During his work as an historian, he has dealt in many of his studies with topics concerning economic history and has used statistical methodologies, among others. Some of the themes he studied the most were monetary colonialism in the Mediterranean, the role of colonialism in the poverty of colonized peoples and the history of Sardinia under foreign colonizers. His studies, in contrast to the previous idea of a "civilization" coming from outside, led him to consider Sardinia as one of the oldest colonies in the world, and to consider what was called its "immobility" as a consequence of such colonization.

Furthermore, he was the author of one of the first censuses of the abandoned villages and villages of Sardinia. His research has made it possible to bring the European methodologies of the period, and especially the French ones, into Sardinian historiography.

Publications 
This is a partial list of John Day's publications:

 
 
 
 
 John Day, Europa dal '400 al '600: fonti e problemi, Atti del convegno internazionale (in Italian), Milan, 1983,  pp. 241–249.

References 

1924 births
2003 deaths
20th-century American historians
American male non-fiction writers
Historians from Illinois
Academic staff of Paris Diderot University
Academic staff of the University of Cagliari
American expatriates in France
American expatriates in Israel
American expatriates in Italy
20th-century American male writers